The Nambikwaran languages are a language family of half a dozen languages, all spoken in the state of Mato Grosso in Brazil. They have traditionally been considered dialects of a single language, but at least three of them are mutually unintelligible.

 Mamaindê (250-340)
 Nambikwara (720)
 Sabanê (3)

The varieties of Mamaindê are often seen as dialects of a single language but are treated as separate  Northern Nambikwaran languages by Ethnologue. Sabanê is a single speech community and thus has no dialects, while the Nambikwara language has been described as having eleven.

The total number of speakers is estimated to be about 1,000, with Nambikwara proper being 80% of that number. Most Nambikwara are monolingual but some young men speak Portuguese. Especially the men of the Sabanê group are trilingual, speaking both Portuguese and Mamainde.

Genetic relations
Price (1978) proposes a relationship with Kanoê (Kapixaná), but this connection is not widely accepted.

Language contact
Jolkesky (2016) notes that there are lexical similarities with the Aikanã, Irantxe, Itonama, Kanoe, Kwaza, Peba-Yagua, Arawak, Bororo, and Karib language families due to contact.

Varieties

Jolkesky (2016)
Internal classification by Jolkesky (2016):

(† = extinct)

Nambikwara
Sabane
Nambikwara, Northern
Guaporé: Mamainde; Negarote; Tawende
Roosevelt: Lakonde; Latunde; Tawande
Nambikwara, Southern
Alantesu: Alantesu; Hahãintesu; Waikisu; Wasusu
Halotesu: Halotesu; Kithãulhu; Wakalitesu; Sawentesu
Manduka: Hukuntesu; Niyahlosu; Siwaisu
Sarare

Loukotka (1968)
Below is a full list of Nambikwaran language varieties listed by Loukotka (1968), including names of unattested varieties.

Eastern dialects
Tagnaní - spoken on the Castanho River (Roosevelt River), Mato Grosso.
Tamaindé - spoken on the Papagaio River and Marquez de Sousa River, state of Mato Grosso.
Neneː - spoken at the confluence of the Juína River and Juruena River, Mato Grosso.
Central dialects
Anunze / Soálesu - spoken between the Papagaio River and Camararé River, Mato Grosso.
Kongoreː - spoken on the Buriti River, Mato Grosso.
Navaite - spoken on the Dúvida River, Mato Grosso. (Unattested)
Taduté - spoken by the neighbors of the Navaite tribe on the Dúvida River.
Western dialects
Tauité / Tawite - spoken on the Camararé River, state of Mato Grosso.
Uaintasú / Waintazú - spoken in Mato Grosso on the right bank of the Pimenta Bueno River. (Unattested)
Mamaindé - spoken on the Cabixi River, state of Mato Grosso. (Unattested)
Uamandiri - spoken between the Cabixi River and Corumbiara River. (Unattested)
Tauandé - spoken on the São Francisco Bueno River, Mato Grosso. (Unattested)
Malondeː - spoken in the same region but exact location unknown. (Unattested)
Unetundeː - spoken on the upper course of the Dúvida River. (Unattested)
Tapóya - language of the same region, exact location unknown. (Unattested)
Northern dialects
Sabané - spoken on the Ananáz River (now the Tenente Marques River) and Juína-Mirim River, state of Mato Grosso.
Jaiá - spoken on the Ananáz River (now the Tenente Marques River). (Unattested)
Lacondeː - spoken on the right bank of the Castanho River (Roosevelt River). (Unattested)

Mason (1950) lists the following varieties under "Nambicuara proper":

Mason (1950)
Northeastern
Eastern: Cocozu
Northeastern: Anunzé
Southwestern
Western: Tamaindé
Central and Southern
Uaintazu
Kabishi
Tagnani
Tauité
Taruté
Tashuité

Sabane is listed by Mason (1950) as "Pseudo-Nambicuara" (Northern).

Vocabulary
Loukotka (1968) lists the following basic vocabulary items for various Nambikwaran languages.

Proto-language

Proto-Nambiquara reconstructions by Price (1978):

Bibliography
Costa, Januacele Francisca da; W. Leo M. Wetzels. 2008. Proto-Nambikwara Sound Structure. Amsterdam: Vrije Universiteit Amsterdam.
Araujo, G. A. (2004). A Grammar of Sabanê: A Nambikwaran Language. Vrije Universiteit Amsterdam. 94. Utrecht: LOT.
Gomes, M. A. C. F. (1991). Dicionário Mamaindé-Português/Português-Mamaindé. Cuiabá: SIL.
Kroeker, M. H. (1996). Dicionário escolar bilingüe Nambikuara-Português, Português-Nambikuara. Porto Velho: SIL.
Price, D. P. (1978). The Nambiquara Linguistic Family. Anthropological Linguistics 20:14-37.

References 

 
Language families

ur:نمبیکوارائی زبانیں